The Mid-North District or Midtown-North is a historic district in the Lincoln Park community area of Chicago, Illinois.  The district was built from 1865 to 1900 by various architects. It is bounded by Fullerton Avenue to the north, Armitage Avenue to the south, Lincoln Avenue to the west and Clark Street to the east. It was designated a Chicago Landmark on August 31, 1977.

References

Historic districts in Chicago
North Side, Chicago
Chicago Landmarks